Variola Vera (Cyrillic: Вариола вера) is a 1982 Yugoslav film directed by Goran Marković.

The subject of the film is based on the 1972 Yugoslav smallpox outbreak. It is a satire of the corruption of the medical and public health field. Although inspired by the real events, the movie features elements of horror. The title refers to the Variola vera virus which causes smallpox.

The film garnered Marković the first prize for best director and the best screenplay at the 1982 Valencia film festival.

A poll of 30 Yugoslav critics and journalists conducted in the newspaper Oslobođenje named it the Yugoslav Film of the Year for 1982.

Plot
The plot of the film follows the events during the smallpox epidemic in the territory of the then SFR Yugoslavia in 1972. The course of the epidemic is monitored, as well as its impact on the psyche and behavior of people who are exposed to the dangers it carries. A Muslim pilgrim returns to the country from Saudi Arabia infected with an unknown disease. Moved from place to place, he dies, and the infection spreads. By the time those in charge realize that it is a disease that was thought to be eradicated, it is already too late - smallpox starts to run rampant. The infected are isolated and left to the logic of a terrible disease that everyone has already forgotten about, considering it a distant past. The film follows the behavior of almost all layers of society in which the epidemic occurred: patients in the hospital, medical staff, ordinary citizens, even politicians, officials of the government at the time. It shows how such a deadly threat helps people show their true colors.

Cast 
 Rade Šerbedžija - Dr. Grujić
 Erland Josephson - Dr. Dragutin Majcan Kenigsmark (Dubbed by Petar Kralj)
 Dušica Žegarac - Dr. Marković
 Varja Đukić - Dr. Danka Uskoković
 Rade Marković - Superintendent Čole
 Vladislava Milosavljević - Nurse Slavica 
 Peter Carsten - UN Epidemiologist (Dubbed by Mihajlo Viktorović)
 Aleksandar Berček - Magistar Jovanović
 Radmila Živković - Nurse Zaga
 Semka Sokolović-Bertok - Dr. Ćirić
 Bogdan Diklić - Duško

References

External links 
 Variola Vera Trailer 
 
 
 
 

1982 films
Yugoslav drama films
1980s Serbian-language films
Serbian drama films
Serbian horror films
Horror drama films
Films set in Belgrade
Films set in Yugoslavia
Films about viral outbreaks
Smallpox in fiction
Smallpox eradication
Films based on actual events
Films directed by Goran Marković
Films set in 1972
Yugoslav horror films